The third Nations Cup tournament was played at Appleby College and Chatham-Kent in Ontario, Canada, in August 2011 following on from an Under-20 version which took place in California a month before. The tournaments included teams representing the USA, South Africa, England and Canada. England retained both titles.

For USA, Canada and South Africa these were the first internationals they had played since the World Cup. Although the final results in both tournaments were as expected, in the senior event England trailed to both USA and Canada before turning the games round - in the case of the USA game from the final play of the game after 7 minutes of added injury time. Canada led 5-3 at half time in the group game before conceding four second-half tries.

All teams used the group phase of the tournament to try out different formations, selecting their strongest available starting XVs in the finals.

Under 20 Nations Cup 2011 (Santa Barbara, California)

Final table

Points scoring
4 points awarded for a win, 2 points for a draw, no points for a loss. 1 bonus point awarded for scoring four or more tries and 1 bonus point for losing by less than 7 points.

Results

Third place

Final

Nations Cup 2011 (Appleby College, Oakville, Canada)

Final table

Results

Third place

Final

See also
Women's international rugby

External links
U20 Nations Cup website
Women's nation Cup website

2011
International women's rugby union competitions hosted by Canada
International women's rugby union competitions hosted by the United States
2011 rugby union tournaments for national teams
2011 in women's rugby union
2011 in Canadian rugby union
2011 in American rugby union
2011 in South African rugby union
2011–12 in English rugby union
rugby union
rugby union
rugby union
August 2011 sports events in Canada